Martin Otčenáš (born August 25, 1987) is a Slovak former biathlete and cross-country skier. He competed at the 2014 Winter Olympics in Sochi, in sprint and individual.

Biathlon results
All results are sourced from the International Biathlon Union.

Olympic Games
0 medals

*The mixed relay was added as an event in 2014.

World Championships
0 medals

*During Olympic seasons competitions are only held for those events not included in the Olympic program.
**The mixed relay was added as an event in 2005.

References

External links
Martin Otčenášat IBU

1987 births
Living people
Cross-country skiers at the 2006 Winter Olympics
Biathletes at the 2014 Winter Olympics
Biathletes at the 2018 Winter Olympics
Olympic biathletes of Slovakia
Olympic cross-country skiers of Slovakia
Sportspeople from Poprad
Slovak male biathletes
Slovak male cross-country skiers